Fernando Gomes may refer to:

Fernando Gomes (football administrator) (born 1952), President of the Portuguese Football Federation
Fernando Gomes (sport shooter) (born 1954), Brazilian sports shooter
Fernando Gomes (Portuguese footballer) (1956–2022), Portuguese footballer
Fernando Gomes (Brazilian footballer) (born 1988), Brazilian footballer
Fernando Gomes (Bissau-Guinean footballer) (born 2002), Bissau-Guinean footballer
Fernando Gomes (politician) (fl. 2012), Guinea-Bissau's Interior Minister

See also
Fernando Gómez (disambiguation)